Jordanita tenuicornis is a moth of the family Zygaenidae.

Distribution
It is found in southern and central Italy and Sicily.

Description
The length of the forewings is 10–12.8 mm for males and 8–10.8 mm for females.

Biology
The young larvae of subspecies turatii feed on Carlina vulgaris and Centaurea ambigua, while mature larvae of this subspecies mine the leaves of Cirsium arvense and Centaurea species. The mine has the form of a fleck mine. The opening is a slit at the side of the mine.

Adults are on wing from April (on Sicily) to July (mountains of Italy).

Subspecies
Jordanita tenuicornis tenuicornis (southern Italy and Sicily)
Jordanita tenuicornis turatii (Bartel, 1906) (central Italy)

Etymology
The species name is derived from tenuis (meaning thin) and cornu (meaning horn) and refers to the thin antennae of this species.

References

C. M. Naumann, W. G. Tremewan: The Western Palaearctic Zygaenidae. Apollo Books, Stenstrup 1999,

External links
Fauna Europaea
The Barcode of Life Data Systems (BOLD)

Procridinae
Moths described in 1847
Endemic fauna of Italy
Moths of Europe